Sir is a Palestinian town in the Qalqilya Governorate in the eastern West Bank, located 8 kilometers east of Qalqilya.

History
Ceramics from the Byzantine era have been found here.

Ottoman era
Sir  was incorporated into the Ottoman Empire in 1517 with all of Palestine. In 1596, it appeared in the tax registers as being in the Nahiya of Bani Sa'b, part of Nablus Sanjak. It had a population of 10 households, all Muslim. The villagers paid a fixed tax-rate of 33.3% on agricultural products, including wheat, barley, summer crops, olive trees, occasional revenues, goats and/or beehives, and a customary tax on subjects in Nablus region; a total of 7,000 akçe. Half of the revenue went to a Waqf.

In 1882 the PEF's Survey of Western Palestine (SWP) noted at Khurbet Sir: "two rock cut tombs, a large mound with terraces cut in the sides, a good well below; has every appearance of an ancient site."

Modern era
In the wake of the 1948 Arab–Israeli War, and after the 1949 Armistice Agreements, Sir came under Jordanian rule. 

The Jordanian census of 1961 found 235 inhabitants in Kh. Sir.

After the Six-Day War in 1967, Sir has been under Israeli occupation.

References

Bibliography

External links
  Welcome To Kh. Sir
Jayyus Town (including Khirbet Sir) (Fact Sheet), Applied Research Institute–Jerusalem (ARIJ)
 Jayyus Town Profile (including Khirbet Sir Locality), ARIJ
Khirbet Sir,  aerial photo, ARIJ
Development priorities and needs in Jayyus (including Khirbet Sir Locality), ARIJ
Survey of Western Palestine, Map 11:    IAA, Wikimedia commons

Villages in the West Bank
Municipalities of the State of Palestine